Moscow Square is a Hungarian film released in 2001. It is named after Moscow Square in Budapest (now called Széll Kálmán Square) and focuses on a group of high school students who would rather party than take notice of the history taking place around them in 1989.

Cast
 Gábor Karalyos – Petya
 Eszter Balla – Zsófi
 Erzsi Pápai – Boci mama
 Ilona Béres – Igazgatónő

External links

2001 films
2001 comedy films
Hungarian comedy films